Horistonotus is a genus of beetles belonging to the family Elateridae.

The species of this genus are found in America.

Species:
 Horistonotus angustifrons Casari, 2011

References

Elateridae
Elateridae genera